Patamda is a village in the Patamda CD block in the Dhalbhum subdivision of the Purbi Singhum district in the Indian state of Jharkhand.

History 
In 1956, along with the reorganisation of the states, three police stations of Manbhum district, namely Patamda, Ichagarh and Chandil were transferred to Singhbhum district. While Patamda was added to Dhalbhum subdivision, Ichagarh and Chandil to Seraikela subdivision.

Geography

Location                                    

Area overview 
The area shown in the map “forms a part of the Chota Nagpur Plateau and is a hilly upland tract”.  The main rivers draining the district are the Subarnarekha and the Kharkai. The area lying between Jamshedpur and Ghatshila is the main industrial mining zone. The rest of the district is primarily depend on the agricultural sector. In the district, as of 2011,  56.9% of the population lives in the rural areas and a high 43.1% lives in the urban areas.

Note: The map alongside presents some of the notable locations in the district. All places marked in the map are linked in the larger full screen map.

Civic administration  
There is a police station at Patamda.

The headquarters of the Patamda CD block is located at Patamda village.

Demographics 
According to the 2011 Census of India, Patamda had a total population of 2,558, of which 1,334 (52%) were males and 1,224 (48%) were females. Population in the age range 0–6 years was 381. The total number of literate persons in Patamda was 1,440 (66.15% of the population over 6 years).

(*For language details see Patamda block#Language and religion)

Education 
Patamda Degree College was established in 1993. Affiliated with the Kolhan University, It has facilities for teaching Hindi, English, Bengali, Santali, Kurmali, philosophy, economics, political science, geography, psychology, sociology, history, music and chhou, physics, chemistry, botany, zoology, mathematics.

Patamda College is a Hindi-medium coeducational institution established in 1984. It has facilities for teaching in classes XI and XII. It has a playground, a library with 65,0000 books, and has 2 computers for teaching and learning purposes.

S.S.High School Patamda is a Hindi-medium co-educational institution established in 1961. It has facilities for teaching from class IX to class XII. The school has a playground and a library with 400  books.

References 

Villages in East Singhbhum district